Ma is a Chinese family name. The surname literally means "horse". As of 2006, it ranks as the 14th most common Chinese surname in Mainland China and the most common surname within the Chinese Muslim community, specifically the Hui people, Dongxiang people and Salar people. In 2019 it was the 13th most common surname in Mainland China. A 2013 study found it to be the 13th most common, shared by 17,200,000 people or 1.290% of the population, with the province with the most being Henan. It is the 52nd name on the Hundred Family Surnames poem. 

The offspring of Zhao She adopted "Ma" (馬), the first word of the district Ma Fu, as their surname. Other romanizations include Mah, Beh and Mar.

Hui Muslims, Salars, Bonan and Dongxiang people commonly adopted Ma as the translation for their surname Muhammad. for e.g. Ma Jian, Ma Benzhai, Ma clique.

During the Ming dynasty, the Zhengde Emperor had a Uyghur concubine with the surname Ma.

Notable people
Ma Anliang (1855–1919), Qing dynasty and National Revolutionary Army (NRA) general
Mah Bow Tan (Ma Baoshan) (born 1948), Singaporean politician
Ma Chao (176–222), Shu Han general in the Three Kingdoms period
Ma Che Kong (born 1974), Hong Kong badminton player
Ma Ching-chiang (Ma Jingqiang), Republic of China Army general
Ma Dahan, Dongxiang anti-Qing dynasty rebel
Ma Dai, Shu Han general in the Three Kingdoms period
Yusuf Ma Dexin (1794–1874), Qing dynasty Islamic scholar
Edward Ma, member of the electronica band Glitch Mob
Henry C. Ma
Ma Hualong (died 1871), head of the Chinese Sufi order Jahriyya and one of the leaders of the Dungan revolt (1862–77)
Ma Huateng (born 1971), entrepreneur and founder of Tencent
Jack Ma (or Ma Yun, born 1964), internet entrepreneur and Executive Chairman of Alibaba Group
James Ma (born 1993), Thai actor
Jeff Ma, former member of the MIT Blackjack Team
Ma Jianrong, Chinese executive in the textile industry. Chairman of Shenzhou International Group Holdings Limited
Ma Jin (born 1988), badminton player
Ma Jun (fl. 220–265), Cao Wei mechanical engineer and official in the Three Kingdoms period
Ma Jun (born c. 1968), environmentalist, non-fiction writer and journalist
Ma Junren (born 1944), Chinese track and field coach
Ma Laichi (1681–1766), founder of the Chinese Sufi Khufiyya movement
Ma Lik (Ma Li) (1952–2007), former Hong Kong Legislative Councillor and Chairman of the pro-Beijing Democratic Alliance for Betterment of Hong Kong (DAB)
Ma Linyi (1864–1938), former Minister of Education in Gansu province under the Nationalist Government
Ma Liyan (born 1968), Chinese female long-distance runner
Ma Long (born 1988), table tennis player, ranked first as of March 2013 in the International Table Tennis Federation
 Mary Ma (1952/53–2019), businesswoman
Ma Mingyu (born 1972), Chinese footballer and national team captain in the 2002 FIFA World Cup
Ma Mingxin (1719–1781), founder of the Chinese Sufi order Jahriyya
Ma Qinghua (born 1987), racing driver
Ma Qingyun (born 1965), architect
Ma Qixi (1857–1914), founder of the Xidaotang
Ma Ruifang (born 1942), author, scholar and professor at Shandong University's School of Literature
Ma Sanli (1914–2003), comedian
Shang-keng Ma (1940–1983), Chinese theoretical physicist
Ma Shaowu (1874–1937), member of the Xinjiang clique in the ROC (1912–49) era
Ma Shenglin (died 1871), Qing dynasty rebel who participated in the Panthay Rebellion
Ma Sicong (1912–1987), violinist and composer
Ma Su (190–228), Shu Han general in the Three Kingdoms period
Ma Teng (died 211), Eastern Han dynasty warlord
Tzi Ma (Ma Zhi) (born 1962), Chinese American actor
Ma Wanfu (1849–1934), Dongxiang anti-Qing dynasty rebel and founder of the Yihewani movement
Ma Weiming (born 1960), Chinese naval engineer 
Ma Xiaochun (born 1964), professional weiqi player
Ma Xiaonian (born 1945), physician and sexologist
Ma Xinyi (1821–1870), Qing dynasty official and general
Ma Yansong (born 1975), architect
Ma Ying-jeou (Ma Yingjiu) (born 1950), President of the Republic of China
Yo-Yo Ma (Ma Youyou) (born 1955), French American cellist
Ma Yuan (14 BC – 49 AD), Eastern Han dynasty general
Ma Yuan (c. 1160–65 – 1225), Song dynasty painter
Ma Yuanzhang, a member of the Chinese Sufi order Jahriyya
Ma Zhanhai (died 1932), NRA general who participated in the Sino-Tibetan War
Ma Zhanshan (1885–1950), NRA general who fought in the Second Sino-Japanese War
Banharn Silpa-archa (Ma Dexiang) (1932–2016), Prime Minister of Thailand from 1995 to 1996 (archa in Thai means "horse")
Ma Chia-ling (b. December 21, 1996) – Taiwanese singer and member of AKB48.
Ma Jiaqi (born 2002), Chinese singer, member of Teens in Times

Members of the Ma clique in the Qing dynasty and the Republic of China (1912–49) era
Ma Bufang (1903–1975)
Ma Bukang
Ma Buqing (1901–1977)
Ma Biao
Ma Chengxiang (1914–1991)
Ma Dunjing (1906–1972)
Ma Dunjing (1910–2003)
Ma Fulu (1854–1900)
Ma Fushou
Ma Fuxiang (1876–1932)
Ma Fuxing (1864–1924)
Ma Fuyuan
Ma Guoliang
Ma Haiyan (1837–1900)
Ma Hongbin (1884–1960)
Ma Hongkui (1892–1970)
Ma Hushan (1910–1954)
Ma Jiyuan (1921–2012)
Ma Lin (1873–1945)
Ma Qi (1869–1931)
Ma Qianling (1824－1909)
Ma Julong
Ma Sheng-kuei (Ma Shenggui)
Ma Zhan'ao (1830–1886)
Ma Zhancang
Ma Zhongying (fl. 1930s)
Ma Xizhen

Westernized-style surname
Bertha Hosang Mah (1896 – 1959), Canadian student 
Fiona Ma (born 1966), American politician and member of the California State Assembly  
Frederick Ma, Chinese businessman from Hong Kong
Geoffrey Ma (born 1956), judge from Hong Kong, China
Jack Ma or Ma Yun (born 1964), Chinese business magnate, philanthropist, internet and technology entrepreneur, founder and executive chairman of Alibaba Group
Jaeson Ma, American entrepreneur
James Ma (born 1993), Thai actor
Jie Ma, traditional Chinese musician
Kenneth Ma (born 1974), Chinese Canadian actor
Qingyun Ma (born 1965), Chinese architect
Sire Ma (born 1987), Chinese actress
Sora Ma (born 1984), Malaysian born Singaporean actress
Stanley Ma (born 1950): Canadian-Quebecois businessman of Chinese origin and founder and President of MTY Food Group
Steve Ma (born 1962), Chinese actor from Taiwan
Steven Ma (born 1971), Chinese actor and singer
Tzi Ma (born 1962), Chinese -American character actor
Wu Ma (1942–2014), Chinese actor, director, producer
Yo-Yo Ma (born 1955), American cellist

See also

List of common Chinese surnames

References

Chinese-language surnames
Individual Chinese surnames